

Lok Sabha

The Lok Sabha (meaning "House of the People") is the lower house of the Parliament of India. Delhi elects 7 members and they are directly elected by the state electorates of Delhi. Members are elected for a term of five years. The number of seats, allocated to the state/union territory are determined by the population of the state/union territory.

Current Constituencies

 
 
Source: Parliament of India (Lok Sabha)

Rajya Sabha

The Rajya Sabha (meaning the "Council of States") is the upper house of the Parliament of India. Delhi elects three members and they are indirectly elected by the state legislators of Delhi. The number of seats allocated to the party, are determined by the number of seats a party possesses during nomination and the party nominates a member to be voted on. Elections within the state legislatures are held using single transferable vote with proportional representation.

Current members
Source: Parliament of India (Rajya Sabha)

See also 
 List of constituencies of the Delhi Legislative Assembly

References 

Elections in Delhi
Politics of Delhi
Parliamentary constituencies